Santa Clara is a village in Grant County, New Mexico, United States. The population was 1,686 at the 2010 census, down from 1,944 in 2000. Today it is a bedroom community for nearby Silver City.

Name
Santa Clara was long known as "Central". Its post office was established under that name on January 8, 1887, and the name was changed to "Santa Clara" in 1996.

Geography
U.S. Route 180 passes around the north and east sides of the village, leading west  to Silver City, the county seat, and south  to Bayard.

Demographics

As of the census of 2000, there were 1,944 people, 696 households, and 496 families residing in the village. The population density was 1,925.3 people per square mile (743.2/km2). There were 821 housing units at an average density of 813.1 per square mile (313.9/km2). The racial makeup of the village was 62.91% White, 0.36% African American, 1.95% Native American, 0.05% Asian, 30.61% from other races, and 4.12% from two or more races. Hispanic or Latino of any race were 83.49% of the population.

There were 696 households, out of which 38.4% had children under the age of 18 living with them, 46.0% were married couples living together, 20.4% had a female householder with no husband present, and 28.7% were non-families. 25.6% of all households were made up of individuals, and 10.6% had someone living alone who was 65 years of age or older. The average household size was 2.79 and the average family size was 3.38.

In the village, the population was spread out, with 32.8% under the age of 18, 8.6% from 18 to 24, 23.7% from 25 to 44, 19.6% from 45 to 64, and 15.3% who were 65 years of age or older. The median age was 32 years. For every 100 females, there were 91.0 males. For every 100 females age 18 and over, there were 83.8 males.

The median income for a household in the village was $20,980, and the median income for a family was $24,732. Males had a median income of $26,471 versus $16,875 for females. The per capita income for the village was $9,484. About 27.1% of families and 28.8% of the population were below the poverty line, including 39.4% of those under age 18 and 14.1% of those age 65 or over.

See also
 Fort Bayard Historic District
 Fort Bayard National Cemetery

References

External links
Village of Santa Clara official website

Villages in Grant County, New Mexico
Villages in New Mexico